The Nokia 6000 series or Classic Business series is range of mobile phones marketed by Nokia.  This family of phones is notable for their conservative, unisex designs, making them popular with business users.

Nokia 6150
The Nokia 6150 is the dual-band version of 
he Nokia 6110 introduced in early 1998.

Nokia 6151

The Nokia 6151 is a mobile phone from Nokia. In the United States and Canada, It was released in the fourth quarter of 2006. It is considered a key player in the 3G collection of the Nokia mobile phones.

Design and appearance
The design of the 6151, primarily based on its previous version the Nokia 6070, has conserved a classical appearance. Buttons and connectors are kept flush in order to maintain the phone's smooth appearance. The phone features a unique design which allows the phone an easy handling of the phone with only one hand. It is available in black, grey, lime green, orange and white.

Nokia 6170

The Nokia 6170 is one of the clamshell phone series from Nokia with a compact form and an integrated VGA camera (640x480 pixels).

Nokia 6216 classic
Nokia has announced its third fully integrated Near Field Communication (NFC) device, the Nokia 6216 classic.
The Nokia 6216 classic is expected to start shipping in the third quarter of 2009.

Nokia 6230 and Nokia 6230i

The Nokia 6230 is a mobile phone based on the Series 40 platform. It features a 16-bit TFT color screen with a resolution of 128×128 pixels, a VGA camera that can record video clips in H.263 (SubQCIF) format at 128×96 pixels, built-in Bluetooth wireless technology, FM radio (when a wired headset is attached to the Pop-Port interface to act as an antenna), and playback of MP3 and AAC audio. It is also EGPRS (EDGE) capable of speeds up to 220 kbit/s. In addition, it has changeable Xpress-on covers available for purchase.

It uses an Extended Li-ion Battery of 850 mAh. The 6230 accepts MMC memory cards up to 1 GB in capacity (supported by later firmware releases) on which multimedia files and data can be stored. SD cards are not supported. It operates on either GSM 900/1800/1900 MHz (Nokia 6230 RH-12), or GSM 850/1800/1900 MHz (Nokia 6230b RH-28) for the North American market.

Cingular Wireless was the primary GSM carrier that offered the Nokia 6230b in the United States. Other companies such as Cincinnati Bell, Simmetry Communications, Viaero Wireless and Telcel also offered this model.

In 2005, Nokia released an updated version, the 6230i model (RM-72) which includes a 1.3 megapixel camera, 208×208 pixels screen resolution (65,536 colors), a slightly larger display, and a raised selection button in the midst of the scroll key. It is also standard UMS (USB mass storage device class) compliant, i.e. no proprietary drivers are required to transfer data to and from the device's memory card. It weighs 99 g (including battery BL-5C) and the dimensions are 103 mm × 44 mm × 20 mm, 76 cc.

Nokia 6230 was nicknamed Matrix during development. The updated version 6230i was nicknamed Matrix 2.

Nokia 6233 and Nokia 6234

The Nokia 6233 phone made by Nokia is the successor to the Nokia 6230i. It is a 3G/GSM/WCDMA mobile phone that runs the Nokia Series 40 (S40) 3rd Edition UI operating system. The phone is said to be the loudest mobile around as it has two speakers. In comparison to predecessors, it has some serious restrictions concerning the user interface, e.g. one can not adjust the brightness or duration of the display backlight. There is also a "Music Edition" sold in Asia regions that comes bundled with the Nokia Music Stand, 512 MB microSD card and A2DP Bluetooth profile support. 

The Nokia 6234 is similar to the 6233, but specialized for customers of Vodafone. It can still however be unlocked to other networks.

Nokia 6255i and Nokia 6256i
The Nokia 6255i is a mid-range clamshell phone, highlighted by a VGA camera. Features include:
 VGA (640x480 pixels) camera with LED flash
 LCD color display with 128x160 pixels supporting 65,000 colors
 BREW and Java ME downloadable games
 MMS allows text and multimedia messaging
 MP3 player and stereo FM radio
 Speech recognition and voice commands for 25 caller IDs
 Supports MIDI, AAC and MP3 custom ringtones

The Nokia 6256i was made for Verizon Wireless. Nokia 6256i is the same as the Nokia 6255i, but it can only be used by Verizon Wireless customers.

Nokia 6260

The Nokia 6260 is the first clamshell smartphone from Nokia. It uses the Series 60 user-interface and the Symbian operating system. The screen rotates on two axes allowing different modes of usage of both the camera and the phone itself, making it unique to other smartphones released at the same time as the Nokia 6260.  Other unique features are a built in radio and the ability to 'hotswap' the memory card (RS-MMC) - that is to change it without turning the unit off.

The Nokia 6260 was specified to play MP3s, although the quality is poor (mono sound and no bass). However, this does not apply for the quality of the built-in radio as this uses a different chip to process the audio.

The processor found in the Nokia 6260 is capable of handling advanced software such as movie players and PC games of recent history such as Doom.

The phone features industry-standard Bluetooth and IrDA connectivity, along with Nokia's proprietary 'Pop-port' for USB and audio connections. The camera is only VGA resolution (640×480 pixels) but has reasonably good color reproduction. The memory card slot can accept an RS-MMC card.

Nokia 6265 and Nokia 6265i

The Nokia 6265 is a CDMA mobile phone. It uses the Series 40 3rd Edition user interface.

The phone features industry-standard Bluetooth and IrDA connectivity. The 6265i also has an integrated GPS receiver. The camera has a 2.0 megapixel resolution and video recording of up to 15 frame/second QCIF resolution. Music support includes MP3, AMR (NB-AMR), AAC, eAAC+, MIDI Tones (poly 64) and MP4. Video supports 3GPP (H.263) and MPEG-4 formats.

Nokia 6270
The Nokia 6270 is a late 2005 quad band mobile phone from Nokia. It is based on the Series 40 third generation platform, and features a 2 megapixel digital camera with 5x digital zoom and a flash, 9 MB of storage plus support for up to a 2 GB miniSD Card, and a 240x320 pixels QVGA screen with 262,144 colors. Software includes a full XHTML compatible web browser, an email client and a media player (MP3 & MP4 supported). 

The phone has the connectivity features Bluetooth, EDGE, Pop-Port and infrared, and is also USB compatible for synchronizing with a PC. 

Along with the music player with MP3 and AAC support, it also has a built-in radio receiver, which is used through the headset supplied. The phone features stereo speakers with 3D sound effects, a new technology which makes the sound more realistic and is now embedded in many of the latest high-class phones. 

It also has active standby, which displays daily activities and meetings on the phone's idle display.

Next in the phone line is the Nokia 6280, a 3G version of the Nokia 6270.

Nokia 6275i
The Nokia 6275i is a CDMA mobile phone.  Basically, it is a "candybar" version of the Nokia 6265. It has a 2.0 megapixel camera with flash and a portrait mirror. It can use microSD cards to expand the memory capacity to 2 GB. It uses the Nokia OS, and can connect to other devices using infrared, USB and Bluetooth technology. The screen has a resolution of 240x320 pixels.

The video recorder comes by default with QCIF (176×144 pixels) capability and can record as much video as can be stored on the micro SD card (up to 2 GB). The default H.263 codec format uses approx 1 MB to 1½ MB of memory for each minute of recorded video. The format can be switched to a better MPEG-4 by using service centre software to adjust the internal settings.

Java applications are supported, and if the carrier has disabled these, they too can be allowed by adjusting the internal settings. Software such as Opera Mini, Google Maps, Flurry, and more, will run fine once the phones settings allow it to run Java MIDLets.

Nokia 6280

The Nokia 6280 is a 3G mobile phone from Nokia. The Nokia 6280 is the 3G sister product to the 2G Nokia 6270. It has a 262K color TFT screen with a 240×320 pixels (QVGA) resolution. It features two cameras, a rear two megapixel camera with an 8x digital zoom and flash, and a front-mounted VGA camera for video calling only. It also has expandable memory via miniSD memory cards. The 6280 uses the Nokia Series 40 mobile platform and can be network locked using the base band 5 locking mechanism. It is available in four colors: Black, Plum, Burnt Orange and Silver.

See also
History of mobile phones

References